Weerahannadige Francisco Fernando alias Puran Appu (Sinhala පුරන් අප්පු) is one of the notable personalities in Sri Lanka's history. He was born on 7 November 1812 in the coastal town of Moratuwa. He left Moratuwa at the age of 13 and stayed in Ratnapura with his uncle, who was the first Sinhalese proctor, and moved to the Uva province. In early 1847, he met and married Bandara Menike, the daughter of Gunnepana Arachchi in Kandy. He was captured by the British after the failure of Matale Rebellion along with Gongalegoda Banda and Ven. Kudapola Thera. He was executed by a firing squad on August 8, 1848. His body was buried in Matale.

The Hero
Appu living in Sri Lanka during the period of British colonial rule. Like many other Sri Lankans, Appu grew opposed to British colonial rule.
On 28.07.1848 Puran Appu led an attack on Matale. This was successful. However, the other leaders who attacked Kurunegala and Wariyapola failed.
Governor Viscount Torrington in a letter to Earl Grey, the Secretary of State for War and the Colonies in London dated October 9, 1849  “I remind you of the last words of Puranappu. He held up his hands and said if there had been half a dozen such men as me to lead, there would not be a white man living in the kandyan Province. This is true. If there had been such leaders, without doubt for a time we should have lost the country.”

Legacy
Francisco (Veera Puran Appu) attended the Wesleyan school in Moratuwa and was a very mischievous boy. After a fight and thrashing the village headman from Lakshapathiya, he fled from Moratuwa in 1825 at the age of 13. He traveled about the country, mostly the hill country – Haldummulla to Badulla and other places. His uncle, W. Marcellenus Franciscu Fernando, was the first Sinhalese proctor who had a flourishing practice at Ratnapura and in 1840 Francisco stayed with him.

It was at this stage of his career that he headed a band of outlaws and initiated a reign of terror against European planters and officials in Uva, much to the delight of His people, His daring exploits against the Europeans in Sri Lanka soon made him a legendary hero in Sri Lanka.

He was now convinced of the necessity of expelling the British from Sri Lanka.

With this end in view, he conferred with the Sangha of Mahiyangana and Muthiyangana who pledged him their support. This was in 1845. About this time he encountered romance and lost his heart to a highland lass, Bandara Menike of Harispattuwa whom he married in 1847. She bore him a daughter. Francisco was now called Puran Appu.
He broke into House of Magistrate Dawson of Badulla and was imprisoned and then broke prison. He cursed Major Rodgers who brought a false charge against him and Major Rodgers was struck by lightning in Nuwara Eliya.

The Gazette notification by the Colonial Secretary, Sir James Emerson Tennent on January 1, 1847, offered 10 pounds for his apprehension and described him as follows

“Puranappu originally of Morette, lately of Kandy, trade – unknown, caste – fisher, aged 34 years, height 5 ft 71/2 inches, hair – long and black, eyes – light hazel, complexion – light, well looking, make – well made, stout, marks of punishment on the back and 4 vaccination marks.

After three weeks of preparation in the early hours of July 28, 1848, a crowd of eight to ten thousand men under Puranappu's leadership armed with guns, spears and knives set off for Kandy from Dambulla.

The plan was for Puranappu, Gongalagoda Banda and Dingirala to go in three different directions then meet at Katugastota and attack Kandy on Sunday, 30 July.

Puranappu's army first attacked Fort McDowl in Matale. Government buildings and property were ransacked – kachcheries, jails, rest houses and court house records. The coffee stores of Lieutenant General Herbert Maddock, a key adviser to the Government in Kandy was set on fire.
Puran Appu was successful in capturing Matale for a while and the people in another demonstration of popular fervor,  proclaimed him King of Kandy.

 His success, however, was short-lived. An ill-trained army, equipped with primitive weapons was no match for the superior arms and organisation of the British Half-way between Matale and Kandy, the Sinhala forces, depleted by desertions and their movements betrayed by traitors, were intercepted by British troops and Puran Appu himself was captured and taken to Kandy. With his capture, the Rebellion fizzled out.

Brought to trial before a Court Martial, he was found guilty of having waged war against H.M. Queen Victoria and condemned to be shot.

On August 8, 1848, on the banks of the Bogambara Wewa, Veera Puran Appu was executed.

Legacy
Weera Puran Appu Vidyalaya, a school in Moratuwa is named after him.
A new frog species found from Adam's Peak, was named Pseudophilautus puranappu, by the researchers for his great dedication to protect the country from foreign invasions. A biographical film of Puran Appu was made on 1978, where Ravindra Randeniya acted as Puran Appu.

See also
 Matale Rebellion
 Gongalegoda Banda

References

External links
 Veera Puran Appu: stood up against the might of British Empire
 Tyrrone F, not worth even a hair of illustrious Weera Puran Appu
 155th Veera Puran Appu Commemoration Ceremony :'Dedication, sacrifice of Veera Puran Appu made British Govt. more favourable to the public'
 Veera Puran Appu - courageous son of Lanka
 
 Gongalegoda Banda and Puran Appu
 Veera Puran Appu: stood up against the might of British Empire, The Daily News
 Dedication, sacrifice of Veera Puran Appu made British Govt. more favourable to the public, The Daily News
 Veera Puran Appu - courageous son of Lanka
 Tyrrone F, not worth even a hair of illustrious Weera Puran Appu

1812 births
Sri Lankan independence movement
British Ceylon period
National Heroes of Sri Lanka
People executed by the United Kingdom by firing squad
Executed Sri Lankan people
People executed by British Ceylon
Prisoners and detainees of British Ceylon
Sinhalese people
1848 deaths
People from Moratuwa
Sri Lankan military leaders
People of the Kingdom of Kandy
People executed by Sri Lanka by firing squad